Joachim Sutton (born 15 May 1995) is a Danish rower who competed for University of California, Berkeley and for the Denmark national team in the coxless pair. In 2021 he qualified for the 2020 Summer Olympics, and won a bronze medal in the Men's Coxless Pair.

References

External links
 

1995 births
Living people
Danish male rowers
Rowers at the 2020 Summer Olympics
Medalists at the 2020 Summer Olympics
Olympic bronze medalists for Denmark
Olympic medalists in rowing
California Golden Bears rowers
People from Roskilde
Sportspeople from Region Zealand